The People Tree is an album by British acid jazz group Mother Earth that was released on the Acid Jazz Records label in 1993. The album was reissued on vinyl by Acid Jazz Records in 2019. The single "Jesse" has been included on a number of acid jazz compilation albums.

Reception
Allmusic awarded the album with 4 out of 5 stars. In his review of the 2019 vinyl reissue for Louder Than War, Matt Mead calls the album "a record of substance, one that would last the years and decades to come".

Track listing
 "Institution Man" (Neil Corcoran, Matt Deighton) – 5:26
 "Jesse" (Deighton, Shauna Greene) – 5:02
 "Stardust Bubblegum" (Corcoran, Deighton) – 3:59
 "Mister Freedom" (Bryn Barklam, Corcoran, Deighton) – 4:44
 "Warlocks of the Mind Part I" (Mother Earth) – 3:05
 "Dragster" (Deighton) – 2:40
 "Find It" (Barklam) – 5:13
 "The People Tree" (Deighton) – 3:40
 "Apple Green" (Deighton, Greene) – 4:24
 "Time of the Future" (Corcoran, Deighton) – 6:17
 "Saturation 70" (Barklam, Corcoran, Deighton, Chris White) – 4:24
 "Illusions" (Corcoran) – 3:02
 "Warlocks of the Mind Part II" (Mother Earth) – 3:13
 "A Trip Down Brian Lane" (Barklam, Corcoran, Deighton, White, Eddie Piller) – 11:11

Personnel
 Matt Deighton – lead vocals, acoustic and electric guitars
 Bryn Barklam – Hammond organ, Fender Rhodes, piano
 Neil Corcoran – bass
 Chris White – drums
 Meryl Kenton Forbes – backing vocals, lead vocals on tracks 2, 3 and 14
 James Taylor – Fender Rhodes
 Simon Bartholomew – guitars, percussion, mandolin, Moog
 Chris Lawrence – lap steel guitar
 Gerard Presencer – trumpet
 Dennis Rollins – trombone
 Michael Smith – saxophone
 Pablo, Snowboy – percussion
 Paul Weller, Shauna Greene, DC Lee, Sherrine, Destry, Obe – backing vocals
 Gered Mankowitz - photography

References

1993 albums
Mother Earth (British band) albums
Acid Jazz Records albums